Júlio Pedro Franque (born 29 November 1996) is a Mozambican footballer who plays as a goalkeeper for Ferroviário and the Mozambique national football team.

Career

International
Franque made his senior international debut on 29 May 2018, keeping a clean sheet in a 3–0 victory over Comoros at the 2018 COSAFA Cup.

Career statistics

International

References

External links

1996 births
Living people
Clube Ferroviário de Maputo footballers
Moçambola players
Mozambican footballers
Mozambique international footballers
Association football goalkeepers
Sportspeople from Maputo